Shippee is an unincorporated community in Red Willow County, Nebraska, United States.

History
A post office was established at Shippee in 1913, and remained in operation until it was discontinued in 1933. The community was named for Leonard Shippee, a local landowner.

References

Unincorporated communities in Red Willow County, Nebraska
Unincorporated communities in Nebraska